The Showdown at Somerby was a regular golf tournament on the Nationwide Tour. It was played at Troy Burne Golf Club in Hudson, Wisconsin in 2004 and 2005 and moved to the Somerby Golf Club in Byron, Minnesota for 2006 and 2007. It was cancelled after four years because of a lack of corporate sponsorship.

The title sponsor from 2004 to 2006 was Scholarship America, which is a nonprofit, 501(c)(3) charity that is the largest provider of scholarships for postsecondary education in the country. The presenting sponsor for the 2007 tournament was Think Mutual Bank.

The 2007 purse was $500,000, with $90,000 going to the winner.

Winners

Bolded golfers graduated to the PGA Tour via the final Nationwide Tour money list.

References

External links
Archive of official site
PGATOUR.com tournament site
Scholarship America(SM)'s official site

Former Korn Ferry Tour events
Golf in Minnesota
Recurring sporting events established in 2004
Recurring sporting events disestablished in 2007
Golf in Wisconsin
2004 establishments in Wisconsin
2007 disestablishments in Minnesota